Japanese football in 1932.

Emperor's Cup

Births
August 25 - Tomohiko Ikoma
January 25 - Yukio Shimomura
February 5 - Hiroaki Sato
December 25 - Michihiro Ozawa

External links

 
Seasons in Japanese football